Sergio Troncoso (born 1961) is an American author of short stories, essays and novels. He often writes about the United States-Mexico border, working-class immigrants, families and fatherhood, philosophy in literature, and crossing cultural, psychological, and philosophical borders.

Biography and literary work

Troncoso, the son of Mexican immigrants, was born in El Paso, Texas. He grew up on the east side of El Paso in rural Ysleta. His parents built their adobe house, and the family lived with kerosene lamps and stoves and an outhouse in the backyard during their first years in Texas. 
Troncoso attended South Loop School and Ysleta High School, where he was editor of the high school newspaper and won a Gannett Foundation scholarship to attend the Blair Summer School for Journalism in New Jersey. His grandfather was Santiago Troncoso, who was jailed 28 times by the Mexican government for publishing anti-corruption articles as editor and publisher of El Día in the 1920s, the first daily newspaper in Ciudad Juárez, Mexico.

Sergio Troncoso was accepted to Harvard College and struggled to adapt to this new world. "When I was at Harvard, I was scared and intimidated and I wasn't sure I belonged," he said in an interview for his 25th-year reunion. Troncoso studied Mexican history and politics to learn about his heritage and graduated magna cum laude in government, with a Latin American Certificate. He won a Fulbright Scholarship to Mexico, where he studied economics, politics, and literature. Later he received two graduate degrees in international relations and philosophy from Yale University, where his interests evolved to questions of the self, philosophy and psychology, and philosophy in literature.

In 1999, his book of short stories, The Last Tortilla and Other Stories (University of Arizona Press), won the Premio Aztlán Literary Prize for the best book by a new Chicano writer, and the Southwest Book Award from the Border Regional Library Association. In his story "Angie Luna," the tale of a feverish love affair in which a young man from El Paso rediscovers his Mexican heritage, Troncoso explores questions of self-identity and the ephemeral quality of love. "A Rock Trying to Be a Stone" is a story of three boys playing a dangerous game that becomes a test of character on the Mexico-U.S. border. "My Life in the City" focuses on a transplanted Texan's yearning for companionship in New York City. "Remembering Possibilities" delves into the terror of a young man attacked in his apartment while he takes solace in memories of a lost love. Troncoso typically sets aside the polemics about social discomfort sometimes found in contemporary Chicano literature and concentrates instead on the moral and intellectual lives of his characters.

His novel The Nature of Truth (Northwestern University Press) was first published in 2003, and is a story about a Yale research student who discovers that his boss, a renowned professor, hides a Nazi past. A reviewer from Janus Head, a journal of Philosophy, Literature, and Psychology, wrote: "The subtlety, and fairness, with which Troncoso presents these conflicting frameworks [Nietzschean valor, Christian pragmatism, and blind inductivism] stand as the novel's crowning intellectual achievement, side by side with the artistic one: a convincing tale of murder and ruminating guilt." In 2003, Troncoso was also inducted into the Hispanic Scholarship Fund's Alumni Hall of Fame.

In 2011, Troncoso published two books. His second novel, From This Wicked Patch of Dust (University of Arizona Press), is a story about the Martinez family, who begins life in a shantytown on the U.S.-Mexico border, and struggles to stay together despite cultural clashes, different religions, and contemporary politics. A reviewer from The Dallas Morning News wrote: "In a media market where cultural stereotypes abound, it's refreshing to read a novel featuring Latino characters who are nuanced and authentic. Sergio Troncoso's latest, From This Wicked Patch of Dust, follows a family from humble beginnings in a Texas border town through several decades as its members move beyond their Mexican Catholic culture to inhabit Jewish, Muslim and Ivy League spaces....These middle spaces have long been fodder for writers, though the El Paso-born and Harvard-educated Troncoso has created new, empathetic characters to explore it. No, the real beauty of this book is that it mines the rich diversity of tradition and culture among Latinos, as well as the commonalities they share with other Americans- love of family, faith and country." The novel was named as one of the best books of the year by Kirkus Reviews and won the Southwest Book Award from the Border Regional Library Association. The novel was chosen as a Notable Book by Southwest Books of the Year. Troncoso's novel was also a finalist for Reading The West Book Award from the Mountains and Plains Independent Booksellers Association, and was shortlisted runner-up for the biannual PEN/Texas Southwest Book Award for Fiction.

Crossing Borders: Personal Essays (Arte Público Press) was also published in 2011, and is a collection of sixteen essays about how Troncoso made the leap from growing up poor along the border to the Ivy League, his wife's battle against breast cancer, his struggles as a writer in New York and Texas, fatherhood, interfaith marriage, and Troncoso's appreciation of Judaism. A reviewer for The El Paso Times wrote: "These very personal essays cross several borders: cultural, historical, and self-imposed....We owe it to ourselves to read, savor and read them again." The collection of essays won the Bronze Award for Essays from ForeWord Reviews, and Second Place for Best Biography in English in the International Latino Book Awards.

Troncoso was inducted into the Texas Institute of Letters in 2012.

In 2013, he co-edited Our Lost Border: Essays on Life amid the Narco-Violence (Arte Público Press), a collection of essays on how the unique bi-national and bi-cultural existence along the United States-Mexico border has been disrupted by recent drug violence. Publishers Weekly called it an "eye-opening collection of essays," and the San Antonio Express-News said it was "exceptionally beautiful and poignant writing." The collection won the Southwest Book Award from the Border Regional Library Association and the Gold Medal for Best Latino-focused Nonfiction Book (Bilingual) from the International Latino Book Awards. In 2013, Troncoso also received the Literary Legacy Award from the El Paso Community College.

On July 29, 2014, the El Paso City Council voted unanimously to rename the Ysleta public library branch in honor of Sergio Troncoso. At the re-dedication ceremony on October 2, 2015, the author announced the creation of the annual Troncoso Reading Prizes to encourage the love of reading and writing in grade school, middle school, and high school students in the Ysleta area.

Troncoso was a judge for the Shrake Award for Best Short Nonfiction from the Texas Institute of Letters in 2014. For three years, he also served on the Literature panel of the New York State Council on the Arts, and in 2014 he was co-chair of that panel.

Arte Público Press also published a revised and updated paperback edition of Troncoso's novel The Nature of Truth in 2014. The revised edition of The Nature of Truth won the Bronze Award for Adult Multicultural Fiction from ForeWord Reviews in 2015, and was also chosen as one of the Top Ten Best Fiction Books for 2014 by TheLatinoAuthor.com. In a review of the revised novel from Prime Number Magazine, Brandon D. Shuler wrote: "Without the intellectual questioning of truth in The Nature of Truth, his mature works, I believe, would not have been possible. Troncoso, primarily known for his US-Mexican Border works, is, as The Nature of Truth suggests, the brightest and most able of the modern Border writers and thinkers."

Troncoso served as one of three national judges for the 2016 PEN/Faulkner Award for Fiction.

In 2017, he was a National Writing Juror in the Critical Essay category for the Scholastic Writing Awards and Final Judge in the Essay category in the New Letters Literary Awards. That year the author was elected to a second two-year term on the board of councilors of the Texas Institute of Letters and in May he was appointed Secretary, an officer of the TIL. In October 2017, Troncoso permanently endowed the Sergio Troncoso Award for Best Work of First Fiction at the Texas Institute of Letters to encourage the next generation of writers from his home state.

On April 7, 2018, Troncoso was elected Vice President of the Texas Institute of Letters. He was again a National Writing Juror for Scholastic Writing Awards, this time in the Personal Essay category in 2018.

In 2019, Troncoso published a collection of linked short stories on immigration, A Peculiar Kind of Immigrant's Son (Cinco Puntos Press), which Junot Díaz praised as a "masterwork" and Luis Alberto Urrea called "a world-class collection." A reviewer for The Texas Observer wrote: "The El Paso author’s newest collection depicts contemporary Mexican American life with a characteristic blend of sorrow and humor. It’s his most powerful work yet, and an essential addition to the Latinx canon."
 Lone Star Literary Life chose the book for the "Best of Texas 2019". "Rosary on the Border," the first story in A Peculiar Kind of Immigrant's Son, won the 2020 Kay Cattarulla Award for Best Short Story from the Texas Institute of Letters. A Peculiar Kind of Immigrant's Son won the Gold Medal for Best Collection of Short Stories from the International Latino Book Awards and the Silver Award for Adult Multicultural Fiction from ForeWord Reviews.

On March 28, 2020, Troncoso was elected President of the Texas Institute of Letters. His two-year term as president was noted for achieving a record number of submissions for the twelve annual literary contests of the Texas Institute of Letters, increased engagement with members that resulted in a record number paying their membership dues, two years of financial surpluses, and the selection of lifetime achievement awards for Benjamin Alire Sáenz and Celeste Bedford Walker, the first African-American to win that award. In a profile by Texas Monthly, Sergio Troncoso said: “I threw my heart and soul into the TIL. That meant representing all of Texas.... The organization truly is morphing into something beyond white guys from Dallas and Austin.” Troncoso's term as TIL president ended at the annual banquet in El Paso, Texas on April 23, 2022.

In 2021, Troncoso edited an anthology of mostly unpublished essays, poetry, and short stories, Nepantla Familias: An Anthology of Mexican American Literature on Families in between Worlds (Texas A&M University Press and Wittliff Collections), which Kirkus Reviews praised in a starred review: "A deeply meaningful collection that navigates important nuances of identity."

In 2022, he published his eighth book and third novel, Nobody's Pilgrims (Lee & Low Books: Cinco Puntos Press). Ben Fountain praised it: "In this superb novel, Sergio Troncoso gives us a fresh take not only on the great American road trip, but on the American Dream itself in all its glorious and increasingly fragile promise." Kirkus Reviews wrote in a review: "Troncoso delivers a surprisingly fast-paced, character-driven story.... A sublime, diverse cast drives this tale of looking for a safe, welcoming home.” Nobody's Pilgrims won the Gold Medal for Best Novel- Adventure or Drama (English) from the International Latino Book Awards.

On January 7, 2023, the Council and Past Presidents of the Texas Institute of Letters voted unanimously to name Sergio Troncoso a Fellow of the Institute.  In its 86-year-old history, the TIL has appointed only seventeen previous Fellows, an honorary designation meant to distinguish TIL members for their service and contributions to the organization. Previous Fellows of the Institute have included J. Frank Dobie, Thomas C. Lea III, John Graves, A.C. Greene, Robert Flynn, William D. Wittliff, and Carolyn C. Osborn. Troncoso is the first Mexican American writer to receive this distinction.

For many years, the author has taught fiction and nonfiction workshops at the Yale Writers' Workshop in New Haven, Connecticut. His literary papers are archived at the Wittliff Collections in San Marcos, Texas.

His stories have been featured in many anthologies, including We Wear the Mask: Fifteen True Stories of Passing in America (Beacon Press), Critical Thinking, Thoughtful Writing (Cengage Learning), Camino Del Sol: Fifteen Years of Latina and Latino Writing (University of Arizona Press), Latino Boom: An Anthology of U.S. Latino Literature (Pearson/Longman Publishing), Hecho en Tejas: An Anthology of Texas-Mexican Literature (University of New Mexico Press), City Wilds: Essays and Stories about Urban Nature (University of Georgia Press), and New World: Young Latino Writers (Dell Publishing).  His work has also appeared in Texas Highways, New Letters, Yale Review, Michigan Quarterly Review, New Guard Literary Review, Houston Chronicle, Texas Monthly, Dallas Morning News, Review: Literature and Arts of the Americas, Newsday, Hadassah Magazine, Other Voices, and many other newspapers and magazines.

Bibliography

Books
Nobody's Pilgrims (Lee & Low Books: Cinco Puntos Press, 2022)
A Peculiar Kind of Immigrant's Son (Cinco Puntos Press, 2019)
From This Wicked Patch of Dust (University of Arizona Press, 2011)
Crossing Borders: Personal Essays (Arte Público Press, 2011)
The Nature of Truth (Northwestern University Press, 2003); (Arte Público Press, 2014)
The Last Tortilla and Other Stories (University of Arizona Press, 1999)

Anthology (editor)
Nepantla Familias: An Anthology of Mexican American Literature on Families in between Worlds, (Texas A&M University Press and Wittliff Collections, 2021)
Our Lost Border: Essays on Life amid the Narco-Violence, (Arte Público Press, 2013)

Anthologies (contributing author)
Nepantla Familias: An Anthology of Mexican American Literature on Families in between Worlds (Texas A&M University Press and Wittliff Collections, 2021)
We Wear the Mask: Fifteen True Stories of Passing in America (Beacon Press, 2017)
New Border Voices: An Anthology (Texas A&M University Press, 2014)
Critical Thinking, Thoughtful Writing (Cengage Learning, 2014)
Writing for Life: Paragraphs and Essays (Pearson Longman Publishing, 2013)
Writing for Life: Sentences and Paragraphs (Pearson Longman Publishing, 2013)
Nuestra Aparente Rendicion (Random House Mondadori, 2011)
You Don't Have a Clue: Latino Mystery Stories for Teens (Arte Público Press, 2011)
Camino Del Sol: Fifteen Years of Latina and Latino Writing (University of Arizona Press, 2010)
Literary El Paso (Texas Christian University Press, 2009)
Hit List: The Best of Latino Mystery (Arte Público Press, 2009)
Hecho en Tejas: An Anthology of Texas-Mexican Literature (University of New Mexico Press, 2007)
Encyclopedia Latina: History, Culture, and Society in the United States (Grolier Scholastic, 2005)
Latino Boom: An Anthology of U.S. Latino Literature (Pearson Longman Publishing, 2005)
Once Upon a Cuento (Curbstone Press, 2003)
Tierra Adentro: Cuentario (Consejo Nacional para la Cultura y las Artes, 2002)
City Wilds: Essays and Stories about Urban Nature (University of Georgia Press, 2002)
New World: Young Latino Writers (Dell Publishing, 1997)

References

External links

 Sergio Troncoso Papers at The Wittliff Collections
Sergio Troncoso Branch Library
Texas Monthly, "Sergio Troncoso Is Making Sure That Texas Literature Represents All of Texas", August 2022
American Book Review Interview with Frederick Luis Aldama, 2021
Literal Magazine: Latin American Voices Interview with Rose Mary Salum, 2021
The Rumpus Interview with Eddy F. Alvarez Jr., 2021
Words on a Wire Interview with Daniel Chacon, 2021
Contra Viento Journal Interview with Gabriel Dozal, 2020
Must Read Fiction Interview with Erin Popelka, 2019

American male essayists
American male novelists
American male short story writers
American writers of Mexican descent
Harvard College alumni
Hispanic and Latino American writers
Hispanic and Latino American short story writers
Hispanic and Latino American novelists
Living people
People from El Paso, Texas
Novelists from New York (state)
Novelists from Texas
Writers from Texas
Yale University alumni
1961 births
20th-century American novelists
21st-century American novelists
20th-century American short story writers
21st-century American short story writers
20th-century American essayists
21st-century American essayists
20th-century American male writers
21st-century American male writers
Fulbright alumni